The Mar de Cortés International Airport , also known as Puerto Peñasco International Airport, is the first fully privately funded airport in Mexico. It was built by Grupo Vidanta and is located in La Jolla de Cortés, 15 minutes from the city of Puerto Peñasco in the state of Sonora and 5 minutes from some of the larger hotel and condominium developments by the Sea of Cortés.

History 

The first airfield in Puerto Peñasco was opened during the 1940s, used by Mexicana de Aviación as a stopover on its route from Mexico City to Mexicali. The airfield consisted of an office with a telegraph operator, who provided information about route conditions. A second, larger airfield was built in 1973, with a small terminal building. It was declared as an official international point of entry on August 5, 1994.

The airfield was significantly improved in 2005 through an important investment by Grupo Vidanta, and included repaving of runway and ramp, enlargement of the air terminal and car parking, construction of the AFF station and perimeter fencing; and vertical and horizontal signage. At the same time, a new commercial airport was being developed and built 10 miles east of the existing airfield.

The new airport was inaugurated on November 5, 2009, when President Felipe Calderón's presidential plane landed on the runway for the Border Governors' meeting. The airport was officially open to the public on October 31, 2009, operating as a Mexican Airport of Entry (M-AOE). The old airfield was then closed.  The airport is able to handle airplanes of Boeing 767 size and larger. The concrete runway is 2500 metres long and 60 metres wide; it is the fourth runway in Mexico to be built entirely with concrete provided by Cemex, and was awarded a Premio Obras Cemex in 2007.

Aeroméxico served the airport in past years, but suspended operations in 2014.

TAR started domestic flights in July 2016, cancelling them four months later.

In 2021, Puerto Peñasco received 1,886 passengers, according to data released by the Direction General of Civil Aeronautics.

Aéreo Servicio Guerrero still has service to Hermosillo.

Airlines and destinations

Passenger

See also

List of the busiest airports in Mexico

References

External links
 Mar de Cortés International Airport

Airports in Sonora